"Romance" is the twenty-third single by the Japanese rock band Buck-Tick, released on March 2, 2005.

Track listing

Limited DVD Edition
1. "LOVE ME (※ 2004 Sun Dec 29 Budokan live)" (3:51)

References

2005 singles
Buck-Tick songs
2005 songs
Ariola Japan singles
Songs with music by Hisashi Imai
Songs with lyrics by Atsushi Sakurai

ja:ROMANCE (BUCK-TICKの曲)